Duff may refer to:

People
 Duff (surname)
 Duff (given name)
 Duff (nickname)
 Karen Duffy, an actress, model, and former MTV VJ once known as "Duff"
 Duff Roman, on-air name of Canadian radio personality and executive David Mostoway (born 1938)

Places
 Duff, Indiana, United States, an unincorporated community
 Duff, Nebraska, United States, an unincorporated community
 Duff, Tennessee, United States, an unincorporated community
 Duff, Saskatchewan, Canada, a village
 Duff Hill, a mountain in County Wicklow, Ireland
 Duff River, a river in County Sligo, Ireland
 Duff Islands, in the Solomon Islands, Pacific Ocean
 Mount Duff, Mangareva Island, French Polynesia
 Mount Duff (Yakutat), a Canadian mountain on the border between Alberta and British Columbia
 Duff Peak, Victoria Land, Antarctica
 Duff Point, Greenwich Island, Antarctica

Arts and entertainment
 The DUFF (novel), by Kody Keplinger
 The DUFF, a 2015 film based on the Keplinger novel
 Duff Beer, a fictional brand of beer on The Simpsons
 Elmyra Duff, a fictional character on Tiny Toon

Other uses
 Duff (dessert), a Bahamian dessert and an English term for pudding
 Duff, another name for plant litter, plant material that has fallen to the ground
 Duff, slang term for buttocks
 Duff baronets, three titles in the Baronetage of the United Kingdom
 , two British Royal Navy frigates
 Duff (1794 ship), a British merchant ship
 Duff House, Banff, Scotland
 Duff Building, Owosso, Michigan, United States, on the National Register of Historic Places
 Down Under Fan Fund
 Daf, also called duff, an Indian frame drum of Persian origin
 "up the duff", British and Australian English slang for being pregnant.

 Duff reaction, a formylation reaction used in organic chemistry

See also
 Duff's (disambiguation)
 DUF (disambiguation)